Armand Sahadewsing (born 7 July 1939) is a former Surinamese football player and manager who has played for S.V. Transvaal in the Surinamese Hoofdklasse, and for AFC DWS in the Dutch Eredivisie. He also played for the Suriname national team and later managed the team for the country's 1982 FIFA World Cup qualifying campaign.

Career

Early career
Sahadewsing began his football career on the Mr. Bronsplein in Paramaribo, Surinam at age 10 playing for KMD (Klein Maar Dapper), a club registered through the Bronsplein Sport Bond which was specifically for shorter people (Klein Maar Dapper is Dutch for "Small but courageous"). After two season with KMD he transferred to the youth ranks of Sparta, Tuna and finally Unitas. At age 16 he transferred to SV Transvaal to play in the Hoofdklasse, the top flight for association football in Suriname.

SV Transvaal
In 1956, Sahadewsing made his debut in the Hoofdklasse at age 16. He would go on to play for Transvaal for a decade, becoming the team's first choice on the  right wing. He was made team captain from 1960 to 1965, and helped Transvaal to win two national championships in 1962 and 1965. He also won the Surinamese Footballer of the Year award in 1965.

AFC DWS
In 1966, Sahadewsing relocated to the Netherlands in pursuit of a KNVB coaching license. While in the Netherlands he joined AFC DWS competing in the Dutch Eredivisie, appearing in two matches in the 1967–68 season, where he played with the likes of Frans Geurtsen and Rob Rensenbrink.

International career 
Sahadewsing played for the Dutch Guyana national team, Dutch Guyana being the predecessor of Suriname, as the Dutch colony was known prior to 1976. He made his debut in 1957, in a 2–1 loss to the Netherlands Antilles, in the CONCACAF leg of the 1962 FIFA World Cup qualifying campaign.

Managerial career
In 1966, Sahadewsing relocated to the Netherlands to obtain a KNVB coaching license. In 1980, he became the manager of the Suriname for the country's 1982 FIFA World Cup qualifying campaign. Suriname were eliminated by Cuba in the 1981 CONCACAF Championship qualification.

Honours

Club
S.V. Transvaal
 SVB Hoofdklasse (2): 1962, 1965

Individual
Surinamese Footballer of the Year: 1965

References

External links
 Armand Sahadewsing at FIFA.com

Living people
1939 births
Sportspeople from Paramaribo
Surinamese footballers
Suriname international footballers
S.V. Transvaal players
AFC DWS players
SVB Eerste Divisie players
Eredivisie players
Surinamese expatriate footballers
Surinamese expatriate sportspeople in the Netherlands
Surinamese emigrants to the Netherlands
Surinamese football managers
Suriname national football team managers
Association football wingers